Protein disulfide-isomerase TMX3 is an enzyme that in humans is encoded by the TMX3 gene.

References

Further reading 

 
 
 
 
 
 

Endoplasmic reticulum resident proteins